"It's Good to Be Us" is a song written by Tim James and Dave Berg, and recorded by American country music artist Bucky Covington. It was released in September 2007 as the second single from his self-titled debut album. The song was produced by Sawyer Brown frontman Mark Miller.

Content
"It's Good to Be Us" is an up-tempo country song about a couple, who despite not having much in terms of wealth, are happy just to be alive and that they have each other ("couldn't ask for more, wouldn't settle for less").

Music video
A music video was released in October 23, 2007. The video for "It's Good to Be Us" was shot at Balance MotoX in Bowling Green, Kentucky, and was directed by Trey Fanjoy. It features Covington as one of several motocross drivers. The drivers are shown doing various high risk tricks throughout the video. A celebration ensues at the end of the video with the drivers, (Bucky among them), and their girlfriends having a good time. Scenes of Covington playing a concert at the track at night time are also intercut into the video.

Chart performance

Year-end charts

References

2007 singles
Bucky Covington songs
Music videos directed by Trey Fanjoy
Songs written by Dave Berg (songwriter)
Songs written by Tim James (country music songwriter)
Lyric Street Records singles
2007 songs